Grand Hotel in Lund, Sweden is one of the city's oldest and most noteworthy hotels and restaurants.

Constructed according to the design of Alfred Hellerström and inaugurated in 1899.

External links

 

Buildings and structures in Lund
Companies based in Lund
19th-century establishments in Skåne County